Lesotho Paramilitary Forces is a Lesotho football club based in Maseru. It is based in the city of Maseru in the Maseru District.

In 1983 the team has won the Lesotho Premier League.

Stadium
Currently the team plays at the 1000 capacity Ratjomose Stadium.

References

External links

Lesotho Premier League clubs
Military association football clubs
Organisations based in Maseru